João Gilberto en México, (Also Ela é Carioca) is a 1970 album by João Gilberto. Purportedly, after living in the United States, where he recorded the landmark Getz/Gilberto, among other works, João stayed in Mexico for what ended up being two years, instead of an initially planned short visit. João Gilberto en Mexico is the assemblage he completed during his stay.

Track listing 
 "De Conversa Em Conversa" (Lúcio Alves, Haroldo Barbosa)
 "Ela é Carioca" (Tom Jobim, Vinicius de Moraes)
 "O Sapo" (João Donato)
 "Esperança Perdida" (Tom Jobim, Billy Blanco)
 "Trolley Song" (Irving Berlin, Vrs. Haroldo Barbosa)
 "João Marcelo" (João Gilberto)
 "Farolito" (Agustin Lara)
 "Astronauta" (Samba da Pergunta) (Pingarilho, Marcos Vasconcellos)
 "Acapulco" (João Gilberto)
 "Bésame Mucho" (Consuelo Velasquez)
 "Eclipse" (Ernesto Lecuona)

References

External links 
João Gilberto en Mexico track listing at Amazon.com.
João Gilberto biography

João Gilberto albums
1970 albums
PolyGram albums